Rožca (in older sources also Rožčica) is a grassy high-elevation mountain pass over the western Karawanks. The saddle is located between Hrušica Peak and Mount Klek, and straddles the border between Slovenia and Austria, above the town of Jesenice. Its slopes serve as sheep pastures.

References

External links
 Information about Rožca on Hribi.net

Mountain passes of Slovenia
Karawanks